This is a list of tennis players who have represented the Switzerland Fed Cup team in an official Fed Cup match. Switzerland have taken part in the competition since 1963.

Players

References

External links
Swiss Tennis

Fed Cup
Lists of Billie Jean King Cup tennis players